Alexander Venters (9 June 1913 – 30 April 1959) was a Scottish footballer, who played for Cowdenbeath, Rangers and Scotland.

Career 
Alex Venters, an inside forward, joined Rangers in November 1933 after his first club Cowdenbeath. He spent a total of 13 years at Ibrox Park, winning three Scottish league titles (1935, 1937 and 1939), two Scottish Cups (1935, 1936) and scoring 102 goals in 201 appearances. 18 of these 102 goals came against Celtic in various competitions. In the last season before association football was suspended due to World War II (1939) Venters was top scorer in the Scottish First Division (35 goals). Venters was also a prolific scorer during World War II; however, as these games were unofficial, his additional 53 wartime goals cannot be added to his official goalscoring record.

After the war, Venters played for Third Lanark, Blackburn Rovers and ended his career with Raith Rovers.

Between 1933 and 1939 he won three caps for Scotland, the first of which was against Ireland in 1933 while with Cowdenbeath. He won a further two official caps (both in matches against England) while at Rangers, in 1936 and 1939. He also played in four wartime internationals.

In 1959 he died prematurely from a heart attack at the age of 45.

Due to his prolific goalscoring in the 1930s and his great record in Old Firm matches he became a member of the Rangers Hall of Fame in 2006.

Personal life 
Venters' father Sandy and brothers Andrew and Jock were also footballers.

References

External links

1913 births
1959 deaths
Association football inside forwards
Blackburn Rovers F.C. players
Cowdenbeath F.C. players
People from Cowdenbeath
Raith Rovers F.C. players
Rangers F.C. players
Scotland international footballers
Scotland wartime international footballers
Scottish Football League players
Scottish Football League representative players
Scottish footballers
English Football League players
Third Lanark A.C. players
Scottish league football top scorers